St Mary Out Liberty (also known as Tenby St Mary Out Liberty) is a community in the southeast of Pembrokeshire, Wales. The community was established in 1974 under changes in local government organisation and has its own community council. It is included, with St Mary In Liberty, in the parish of Tenby. The community includes the villages of New Hedges, Gumfreston plus a small part of Saundersfoot.

History
The name Out Liberty refers to the fact that this part of the parish was outside the borough of Tenby. The name dates as least as far back as the 1834 Poor Law, when the area was responsible for its own poor. In 1881 the majority of males in the parish were occupied in agriculture.
In 1932 part of the area was transferred to St Mary In Liberty.

Apart from the parish church, the community contains three listed buildings: Knightston Farmhouse, the attached malthouse and bakery, and a cart shed. The farm is early 19th century.

Records for the community from 1974 to 2012 are held in the Pembrokeshire Archives at the County Records Office in Haverfordwest.

Community area
The community is bordered by East Williamston, Saundersfoot, Tenby and St Florence. Part of the community is in the town of Tenby itself.

St Mary's Church

The church, after which the community is named, dates at least to the 13th century and is the parish church of Tenby. The present building is Grade I listed.

References

External links
GENUKI historical information

Communities in Pembrokeshire
Carmarthen Bay